Alfred Johannot (March 21, 1800 – 1837) was a French painter and engraver born in Offenbach, Germany. His family were French refugees who went to Germany after the Edict of Nantes was revoked. He started out as an engraver, and then came into being a professional painter in 1831. His work was collected by Louis Philippe I and was displayed at the Palace of Versailles. He often painted contemporary court and ceremonial themes, before moving into historical French subjects. Johannot designed the covers for the first illustrated French editions for numerous British writers such as Lord Byron. He died on 7 December 1837.

References

External links
 

1800 births
1837 deaths
19th-century engravers
French engravers
19th-century French painters
French male painters
People from Offenbach (district)
German people of French descent
19th-century French male artists